A Cowboy Has to Sing is the third Sons of the San Joaquin album and the first for a major label.  All of the album's songs were written by members of the Sons of the Pioneers.  Though newly recorded, the songs on this album can all be found on the two previous releases.

Track listing

Personnel

Sons of the San Joaquin
Jack Hannah
Joe Hannah
Lon Hannah

Additional personnel
Joey Miskulin – accordion
Mark Casstevens – acoustic guitar, arch top guitar
Pat Flynn – acoustic guitar
Craig Nelson – acoustic bass
Sonny Garrish – pedal steel
Rob Hajacos – fiddle
Dennis Burnside – piano, synthesizer
Lonnie Wilson – drums, percussion

Production
Michael Martin Murphey – executive producer, producer
Joey Miskulin – producer
Richard Helm – A&R direction
Patricia Miskulin – production coordinator
Recorded at:
The Reflections and the Doghouse, Nashville, TN
Gary Paczosa – engineer
Toby Seay – assistant engineer
Marshall Morgan – mixer
Mastered at:
Georgetown Masters, Nashville, TN
Denny Purcell – mastering
William Matthews – watercolor painting
Steven Whatley – design

Track information and credits verified from the album's liner notes.

References

External links
Official site

1992 albums
Sons of the San Joaquin albums